The boys competition of the skeleton events at the 2012 Winter Youth Olympics in Innsbruck, Austria, was held on January 21, at the Olympic Sliding Centre Innsbruck. 14 athletes from 13 different countries took part in this event.

Results

References

External links
olympedia.org

Skeleton at the 2012 Winter Youth Olympics